Heroes and Villains: The True Story of the Beach Boys is a 1986 book by American journalist Steven Gaines that covers the history of the Beach Boys. The contents are focused on the band members' private lives and personal struggles, with little commentary reserved for the music itself. Coverage spans the group's early years to Dennis Wilson's death in 1983. It was the third major biography written about the band, following David Leaf's The Beach Boys and the California Myth (1978) and Byron Preiss' The Beach Boys (1979).

Reception

Reviewing the book for the Los Angeles Times, Don Waller wrote,

Chicago Readers James Jones described the biography as a "merciless", "detailed", and "lurid account of rock-star excess that manages to be even-handed by leaving no one unscathed but seldom articulates the beauty of the band's music." In 2004, another writer for the Los Angeles Times referred to it as "the definitive Beach Boys book".

Film adaptation
In 1990, Heroes and Villains was adapted into the ABC television film Summer Dreams: The Story of the Beach Boys. Gaines later commented that he had no involvement with the film and thought "the producers did a lousy job."

References

External links 
 
 [ Heroes and Villains: The True Story of the Beach Boys] at Google Books

American biographies
Biographies about musicians
Books about the Beach Boys
1986 non-fiction books
New American Library books